The New Right (HaYamin HeHadash) is a right-wing political party in Israel, established in December 2018 by Ayelet Shaked and Naftali Bennett. The New Right aims to be a right-wing party open to both religious and secular people. The party did not win any seats in the April 2019 election, though it won three seats in the subsequent election of September 2019, retained these in the March 2020 election and increased to seven seats in the 2021 Israeli legislative election. It is currently the sole member of the Yamina alliance.

History
The party was formed in December 2018, when Naftali Bennett, Ayelet Shaked, and Shuli Mualem left the Jewish Home, using the registration of the unused Tzalash party. The party's legal name remains Tzalash, though it was restyled as an abbreviation for Tzion LeShevah (an IDF citation), rather than the previous Tziyonut Liberaliyut Shivyon (Zionism, Liberalism, Equality) of the original Tzalash but Tziyonut Liberaliyut Shivyon is still the legal name of the party. Among the reasons given for the split was the purely religious nature of the Jewish Home.

On 2 January 2019, it was announced that Caroline Glick, a columnist at The Jerusalem Post, had joined the party. Deaf rights activist Shirly Pinto joined the party on 8 January 2019; Shaked stated that Pinto would be an "effective advocate for the rights of people with disabilities". In the September 2019 election, it joined the Yamina alliance, alongside the Jewish Home and Tkuma. The alliance officially split into two factions (the New Right, and the Jewish Home/Tkuma) on 10 October. The New Right also unsuccessfully attempted to negotiate an alliance with Zehut. On 8 November, Prime Minister Benjamin Netanyahu announced that the New Right would be merging with his ruling Likud party, though Shaked rebutted the idea the next day.

Prior to the 2020 Israeli legislative election, the New Right entered talks with the New Liberal Party for an electoral alliance. Bennett subsequently approached Zehut leader Moshe Feiglin for an alliance, although Feiglin declined the offer. On 14 January 2020, the New Right announced it had formed an electoral alliance with Tkuma. The party reformed the Yamina alliance on 15 January, with The Jewish Home and Tkuma again joining. Bennett rejected the prospect of expanding the alliance to include Otzma Yehudit, despite pressure from Netanyahu. On 22 April, it was reported that Bennett was now "considering all options" for Yamina's political future, including departing from Netanyahu's government, which had just agreed to form a joint government with leader of the opposition Blue and White party Benny Gantz, and joining the opposition. Bennett was said to be unhappy with the new coalition government's decision to hold back on the issue of judicial reform. On 14 May, The Jewish Home's only Knesset member, Rafi Peretz ended his status as a member of Yamina, and agreed to join Netanyahu's new government as well.  On 15 May, the New Right, along with Tkuma, split with Netanyahu and made the Yamina alliance a member of the opposition. On 17 May, Bennett met with Gantz, who also succeeded him as Defence Minister, and declared that both Yamina parties were now "head held high" members of the opposition.

On 9 May 2021, it was reported that Bennett and Yesh Atid leader Yair Lapid had made major headway in the coalition talks for forming a new Israeli government. On 30 May, going against their constituents' will, all but one Yamina MK agreed to back joining a coalition  government with Lapid.

Platform 
The New Right platform, as detailed by its website, is:

Promotion of cooperation between religious and secular Jews.
The Land of Israel belongs to the Jewish people.
Opposition to the establishment of a Palestinian state.
Belief in economic liberalism.
Belief in personal freedom and personal responsibility.
Israel is the nation-state of the Jewish people, and only of the Jewish people.
Full civil rights for minorities.
Promotion of the Jewish tradition and the Jewish character of the state, without coercion.
Opposition to Judicial activism.
Promotion of the high-tech industry through a laissez-faire approach. 
Resistance to unnecessary regulation.
The state should care for those who can not take care of themselves, while those who are able to work must work.

Ayelet Shaked said the party would work to arrange religious and secular relations on the basis of mutual understanding and an updated version of the Gavison-Medan Covenant.

Leaders

Knesset members

Knesset election results

References

External links

 
Gavison-Medan model

 
Political parties in Israel
Zionist political parties in Israel
Conservative parties in Israel
2018 establishments in Israel
Political parties established in 2018
National conservative parties
Right-wing parties
Right-wing politics in Israel
Naftali Bennett